The Thermoleophilia are a class of Actinomycetota.

Phylogeny

Taxonomy
The currently accepted taxonomy is based on the List of Prokaryotic names with Standing in Nomenclature (LPSN) and National Center for Biotechnology Information (NCBI).

 Order Gaiellales Albuquerque et al. 2012
 Family Gaiellaceae Albuquerque et al. 2012
 Order Miltoncostaeales Li et al. 2021
 Family Miltoncostaeaceae Li et al. 2021
 Order Solirubrobacterales Reddy and Garcia-Pichel 2009
 Family Baekduiaceae An et al. 2019
 Family Conexibacteraceae Stackebrandt 2005
 Family Paraconexibacteraceae Chun et al. 2020
 Family Parviterribacteraceae Foesel et al. 2015b
 Family Patulibacteraceae Takahashi et al. 2006
 Family Solirubrobacteraceae Stackebrandt 2005
 Order Thermoleophilales Reddy and Garcia-Pichel 2009
 Family Thermoleophilaceae Stackebrandt 2005

See also
 List of bacteria genera
 List of bacterial orders

References

Actinomycetota